Pieter "Piet" Kleine (born 17 September 1951) is a former speed skater from the Netherlands who specialized in the longer distances.

Short biography
At the 1976 Winter Olympics in Innsbruck, Piet Kleine became Olympic Champion on the 10,000 m, beating world record holder Sten Stensen – who won silver – in a close race. This was a reversal of the roles in the Olympic 5,000 m (which had been held three days earlier), in which Stensen had won gold and Kleine silver. In both the 5,000 m and the 10,000 m, Dutch – later French – speed skater Hans van Helden (then world record holder on the 5,000 m) won bronze. Later that same year (1976), Kleine broke 4 worlds records (including Van Helden's 5,000 m world record) and also became World Allround Champion.

Kleine participated again in the Winter Olympics of Lake Placid (1980), winning Olympic silver on the 10,000 m behind Eric Heiden. He ended his career as a speed skater in 1981 and started a successful career in amateur bicycle racing. In 1985, as a member of the Dutch national team, he finished 5th at the World Championships on the 100 km team time trial.

In 1986, Kleine became a marathon skater. This led to some controversy in 1997 when he finished 5th in the Elfstedentocht, but was subsequently removed from the final list of results because of a missing stamp on his stamp card. The controversy lay in the fact that, afterwards, it became clear that in the past several winners of the Elfstedentocht had missed stamps too, but were still declared the winners.

Kleine ended his skating career in 2001 and continued his profession as a postman, a profession he had always kept alongside his sports careers. In his free time, Kleine is the leader of a team of marathon skaters.

He later coached Dan Jansen.

Records

World records
Over the course of his career, Kleine skated 4 world records:

Source: SpeedSkatingStats.com

Personal records

Kleine has an Adelskalender score of 164.899 points. His highest ranking on the Adelskalender was 2nd place.

Tournament overview

source:

Medals won

Medals
An overview of medals won by Kleine at important championships he participated in, listing the years in which he won each:

References

External links
Piet Kleine at speedskatinghalloffame.com
Piet Kleine's ranking and personal records on the current Adelskalender

1951 births
Living people
People from Hoogeveen
Dutch male speed skaters
Olympic speed skaters of the Netherlands
Speed skaters at the 1976 Winter Olympics
Speed skaters at the 1980 Winter Olympics
Olympic gold medalists for the Netherlands
Olympic silver medalists for the Netherlands
Olympic medalists in speed skating
World record setters in speed skating
Medalists at the 1976 Winter Olympics
Medalists at the 1980 Winter Olympics
World Allround Speed Skating Championships medalists
Sportspeople from Drenthe